Lara Knutson (born 1974) is an American artist and industrial designer based in New York City.

A native of Beach Haven, New Jersey, Knutson was fascinated as a child by the play of light on seashells along the beachfront in her hometown, as well as the texture they would create when crushed; she credits this as an influence in her work. She attended Pratt Institute, receiving her bachelor's degree in architecture and her master's degree in industrial design. She uses reflective glass fabric in her work, stemming from experiments she made while working on her master's thesis in 2011. Knutson was among the artists featured in the exhibit "40 Under 40: Craft Futures" at the Renwick Gallery of the Smithsonian Museum of American Art, and one of her pieces was subsequently accessioned by the museum. Her work is also included in the collection of the Corning Museum of Glass, and has been sold by the Museum of Modern Art in its gift shop.

References

1974 births
Living people
American industrial designers
21st-century American artists
21st-century American women artists
Pratt Institute alumni
People from Beach Haven, New Jersey
Artists from New Jersey